Aric Putnam (born July 7, 1972) is an American politician and a member of the Minnesota Senate. A member of the Democratic-Farmer-Labor Party (DFL), he represents District 14, which includes parts of Benton, Sherburne, and Stearns counties in central Minnesota.

Early life, education, and career 
Putnam was born on Andrews Air Force Base while his father fought in the Vietnam War. After returning, his family moved to California, where he grew up. After graduating from high school, Putnam earned his B.A. at San Francisco State University. He later moved to Maine, where he completed his M.A. at the University of Maine. In the late 1990s, Putnam moved to Minneapolis, Minnesota, where he completed his PhD at the University of Minnesota. He has been a professor of communications at the College of Saint Benedict and Saint John's University since 2003.

Minnesota State Senate 
Putnam was elected in 2020, defeating incumbent Republican Jerry Relph, who died after the election. He was an unsuccessful candidate for District 14A of the Minnesota House of Representatives in 2016 and 2018 against Republican incumbent Tama Theis.

Putnam serves on the following committees:

 Aging and Long-Term Care Policy
 Higher Education Finance and Policy
 Jobs and Economic Growth Finance and Policy

Electoral history

References 

Democratic Party Minnesota state senators
21st-century American politicians
College of Saint Benedict and Saint John's University faculty
University of Minnesota alumni
University of Maine alumni
San Francisco State University alumni
Politicians from St. Cloud, Minnesota
Living people
1972 births